Admiral Sir George Neville, KCB, CVO (18 March 1850 – 5 February 1923) was a Royal Navy officer. His career was associated with that of Prince Alfred, Duke of Edinburgh, with whom he served in six ships over two decades.

The second son of Ralph Neville-Grenville MP, George Neville entered HMS Britannia as a cadet in 1863.

References 

1850 births
1923 deaths
Royal Navy admirals
Knights Commander of the Order of the Bath
Commanders of the Royal Victorian Order